A teaching method comprises the principles and methods used by teachers to enable student learning. These strategies are determined partly on subject matter to be taught and partly by the nature of the learner. For a particular teaching method to be appropriate and efficient it has take into account the learner, the nature of the subject matter, and the type of learning it is supposed to bring about.

The approaches for teaching can be broadly classified into teacher-centered and student-centered. In a teacher-centered (authoritarian) approach to learning, teachers are the main authority figure in this model. Students are viewed as "empty vessels" whose primary role is to passively receive information (via lectures and direct instruction) with an end goal of testing and assessment. It is the primary role of teachers to pass knowledge and information onto their students. In this model, teaching and assessment are viewed as two separate entities. Student learning is measured through objectively scored tests and assessments. In Student-Centered Approach to Learning, while teachers are the authority figure in this model, teachers and students play an equally active role in the learning process. This approach is also called authoritative. The teacher's primary role is to coach and facilitate student learning and overall comprehension of material. Student learning is measured through both formal and informal forms of assessment, including group projects, student portfolios, and class participation. Teaching and assessments are connected; student learning is continuously measured during teacher instruction.

Explanation 
The most basic teaching method is explanation. Explanation is characterized by its function as "a tool that is used by a speaker for understanding or 'giving a sense' to the object of communication, of a debate, or a discussion ... The role of an explanation is to make clearer the meaning of an object (method, term, assignment) maintaining formally the necessary distance between the object of the action or study and the tools. In the learning/teaching process, explanation is a tool used by both, teacher and students. Its goal is to manifest comprehension.

Traditionally, explanation belongs to monological teaching methods where the information is transmitted from the teacher to the students (together with e.g. narrative, description or lecture). Skalková, 1999, says that in practice, individual forms of explanation often percolate. In this perspective, explanation is seen as the task fulfilled by the teacher with students passively receiving what is presented. Collecting feedback on students' perceptions of whether explanations are clearly identified whether students feel particular teaching assisted them in understanding the subject matter. Without student understanding, no explanation can be said to be clear. 
We see explanation in a much broader sense:

Communication in school is a mutual interchange of information among teachers and students, students and students during the educational process, i.e. students have an active role in the whole process (Mareš & Křivohlavý, 1995). Using explanation in a mathematics classroom is a normal procedure, but its roles and forms vary. Predominantly explanation is seen as a tool for describing relevant phenomena, developing students' logical thinking, and guiding students by inductive judgement to generalising. It leads to clarifying interrelations, demonstrating, and  justifying (Skalková, 1999, p. 172).

Although explanation is not often explicitly studied in literature, it is present in the background of most papers dealing with communication and reasoning. "Good teaching is good explanation" (Calfee 1986: 1-2). This quotation reflects the belief that the capacity to explain is critically important in teaching (Havita 2000). According to Behr (1988: 189), the art of explaining - the ability to provide understanding to others - is the central activity of teaching. Therefore, to achieve the goal of teaching, the teacher must adopt effective teaching methods that can lead to learners understanding the subject being taught. Being the most commonly used teaching method, explanation integrates well in all methods of instruction, such as discussions, seminars, practical lessons and tutorials (Havita 2000). Therefore, if used properly, this teaching method can develop logical operations: induction, deduction, comparison, analysis, synthesis and analogy. The main objective of explanation in teaching is to enable the learners to take intelligent interest in the lesson, to grasp the purpose of what is being done, and to develop their own insight and understanding of how to do it (Rahaman 2004). In addition, and with specific reference to technology education, explanation is used in classroom teaching to provide students with an understanding of the complex and interrelated nature of technology, which is technical, procedural, conceptual and social (Hansen and Froelick 1994). This involves the ability by the teacher to use explanation effectively in order to communicate information to students. From the standpoint of technology education, explanation in teaching is an intentional activity, which represents the discovery of truth, which is based on concrete deductive arguments (Gwyneth 2007). Explanation as it pertains to teaching can be considered as an attempt to provide understanding of a problem to others (Brown and Atkins 1986: 63).

Most formal definitions characterize explanation as a statement that makes something comprehensible by describing the relevant structure or operation or circumstances. Predominantly, explanation is seen as a tool for describing relevant phenomena, developing students' logical thinking, and guiding students by inductive judgement to generalising. It leads to clarifying interrelations, demonstrating and justifying (Skalková 1999:172). Mayes (2006) argues that explanation goes beyond mere description. Accordingly, a key aspect of explanation is the emphasis on why things happen. In other words, one can think of explanation as an attempt to identify the cause of something. Fairhurst (1981) contextualized explanation in term of requiring something to be explained (the phenomenon that needs to be explained), an explainer (the provider of the explanation) and the explainee (the recipient of the explanation). In this context, Metcalf and Cruickshank (1991) argued that the role of an explanation is to make some concept, procedure or rule plain and comprehensible. Brown and Armstrong (1984) operationally defined explanation as an attempt to provide understanding of a problem to others. This definition strengthens the view of Perrott (1982) who argued that a clear explanation depends on (a) identification of the elements to be related to, for example objects, events, processes and generalisation, and (b), identifying the relationship between them, for example casual, justifying and interpreting. Horwood (2006), on the other hand provides a distinction between explanation and description. According to Horwood (2006), description is purely informational, and the bits of information are isolated from any network of relatedness. In this context, an explanation is given when connections are drawn between and among pieces of information. Furthering this view, Hargie and Dickson (2003) argue that the act of explaining is essentially the same act of describing, instructing or giving of information.

According to Martin (1970: 59), the job of someone who explains something to someone "is to fill in the gap between his audience's knowledge or beliefs about some phenomena and what he takes to be the actual state of affairs". From Martin's point of view one can argue that what counts is causing the audience to know or believe something of which they were previously ignorant. At the extreme end, explanation has been thought of in a restricted sense as a special type of telling which goes beyond description. Pavitt (2000) is of the view that answering the question "why" is an explanation. In another debate, Trevor (2002) argues that for an explanation to be good the explanation must be valid in the context in which it is used and must also be understood by the listener. This implies that for an explanation to be understood, it should be clearly presented by the explainer.

In this regard, it is part of the responsibility of the explainer to ensure that his or her explanation appears sufficiently worthwhile and interesting to the listener for them to attend to the information being provided (Wragg 2003). From Wragg's point of view, good explanations can be described as clearly structured and interesting to the explainer. While good explanation can unlock understanding, poor or inadequate explanations may lead to confusion and boredom. From another standpoint, Gordon et al. (2006) are of the opinion that explanation is deemed successful if it fulfills the purpose of explanation. This implies that for an explanation to be understood, the explanation has to appear to be well structured by the explainee.

In the context of education, good explanation in teaching is essential for unlocking the students' understanding of the subject. It develops students' logical thinking and provides guidance by inductive judgment to generalizing. Leinhardt (1990: 3-4) distinguished between two types of teaching related to explanations: instructional and disciplinary. According to Leinhardt (1990), instructional explanations aim to explain concepts, procedures, events, ideas and classes of problems in order to help students understand, learn and use information in a flexible way. Disciplinary explanations are built around a core of conventions within each particular discipline and try to explain what constitutes evidence, what is assumed, and what the agenda for the discipline is. They provide the legitimacy of new knowledge, reinterpret old knowledge, and challenge and address existing knowledge (Leinhardt 1990). From a learning perspective, explanation holds a special place as one of the core critical thinking skills (Facione 1990). Good critical thinkers, according to Facione (1998: 5), are those who can explain what they think and how they arrived at that judgment. The Delphi Study expert panel, cited by Facione (1998: 6), defined explanation as being able "to state the results of one's reasoning; to justify that reasoning in terms of the evidential, conceptual, methodological, criteriological, and contextual considerations upon which one's results were based; and to present one's reasoning in the form of cogent arguments". Explanation that works (Lipton 2004) is one that is "sticky" (people remember it, think about it, and can repeat it, often even days or weeks later), is easily communicated (people can explain it to each other), and guides thinking in new and better directions (it leads to new kinds of reasoning, which are not only more constructive and accurate but more engaging).

Methods of teaching
Howard Gardner identified a wide range of modalities in his Multiple Intelligences theories. The Myers-Briggs Type Indicator and Keirsey Temperament Sorter, based on the works of Jung, focus on understanding how people's personality affects the way they interact personally, and how this affects the way individuals respond to each other within the learning environment.

Lecturing

The lecture method is just one of several teaching methods, though in schools it's usually considered the primary one. The lecture method is convenient for the institution and cost-efficient, especially with larger classroom sizes. This is why lecturing is the standard for most college courses, when there can be several hundred students in the classroom at once; lecturing lets professors address the most people at once, in the most general manner, while still conveying the information that they feel is most important, according to the lesson plan. While the lecture method gives the instructor or teacher chances to expose students to unpublished or not readily available material, the students plays a passive role which may hinder learning. While this method facilitates large-class communication, the lecturer must make constant and conscious effort to become aware of student problems and engage the students to give verbal feedback. It can be used to arouse interest in a subject provided the instructor has effective writing and speaking skills.

Demonstrating

Demonstrating, which is also called the coaching style or the Lecture-cum-Demonstration method, is the process of teaching through examples or experiments. The framework mixes the instructional strategies of information imparting and showing how. For example, a science teacher may teach an idea by performing an experiment for students. A demonstration may be used to prove a fact through a combination of visual evidence and associated reasoning.

Demonstrations are similar to written storytelling and examples in that they allow students to personally relate to the presented information. Memorization of a list of facts is a detached and impersonal experience, whereas the same information, conveyed through demonstration, becomes personally relatable. Demonstrations help to raise student interest and reinforce memory retention because they provide connections between facts and real-world applications of those facts. Lectures, on the other hand, are often geared more towards factual presentation than connective learning.

One of the advantages of the demonstration method involves the capability to include different formats and instruction materials to make the learning process engaging. This leads to the activation of several of the learners' senses, creating more opportunities for learning. The approach is also beneficial on the part of the teacher because it is adaptable to both group and individual teaching. While demonstration teaching, however, can be effective in teaching Math, Science, and Art, it can prove ineffective in a classroom setting that calls for the accommodation of the learners' individual needs.

Collaborating

Collaboration allows student to actively participate in the learning process by talking with each other and listening to others opinions. Collaboration establishes a personal connection between students and the topic of study and it helps students think in a less personally biased way. Group projects and discussions are examples of this teaching method. Teachers may employ collaboration to assess student's abilities to work as a team, leadership skills, or presentation abilities. 

Collaborative discussions can take a variety of forms, such as fishbowl discussions. It is important for teachers to provide students with instruction on how to collaborate. This includes teaching them rules to conversation, such as listening, and how to use argumentation versus arguing. After some preparation and with clearly defined roles, a discussion may constitute most of a lesson, with the teacher only giving short feedback at the end or in the following lesson.

Some examples of collaborative learning tips and strategies for teachers are; to build trust, establish group interactions, keeps in mind the critics, include different types of learning, use real-world problems, consider assessment, create a pre-test, and post-test, use different strategies, help students use inquiry and use technology for easier learning.

Classroom discussion 
The most common type of collaborative method of teaching in a class is classroom discussion. It is also a democratic way of handling a class, where each student is given equal opportunity to interact and put forth their views. A discussion taking place in a classroom can be either facilitated by a teacher or by a student. A discussion could also follow a presentation or a demonstration.  Class discussions can enhance student understanding, add context to academic content, broaden student perspectives, highlight opposing viewpoints, reinforce knowledge, build confidence, and support community in learning. The opportunities for meaningful and engaging in-class discussion may vary widely, depending on the subject matter and format of the course. Motivations for holding planned classroom discussion, however, remain consistent. An effective classroom discussion can be achieved by probing more questions among the students, paraphrasing the information received, using questions to develop critical thinking with questions like "Can we take this one step further?;" "What solutions do you think might solve this problem?;" "How does this relate to what we have learned about..?;" "What are the differences between ... ?;" "How does this relate to your own experience?;" "What do you think causes .... ?;" "What are the implications of .... ?"

It is clear from "the impact of teaching strategies on learning strategies in first-year higher education cannot be overlooked nor over interpreted, due to the importance of students' personality and academic motivation which also partly explain why students learn the way they do" that Donche agrees with the previous points made in the above headings but he also believes that student's personalities contribute to their learning style. The way a student interprets and executes the instruction given by a teacher allows them to learn in a more effective and personal way. This interactive instruction is designed for the students to share their thoughts about a wide range of subjects.

Class discussions have also proven to be an effective method of bullying prevention and intervention when teachers discuss the issue of bullying and its negative consequences with the entire class. These discussions have shown to increase the number of students who would help other students when they are victimized.

Debriefing

The term "debriefing" refers to conversational sessions that revolve around the sharing and examining of information after a specific event has taken place. Depending on the situation, debriefing can serve a variety of purposes. It takes into consideration the experiences and facilitates reflection and feedback. Debriefing may involve feedback to the students or among the students, but this is not the intent. The intent is to allow the students to "thaw" and to judge their experience and progress toward change or transformation. The intent is to help them come to terms with their experience. This process involves a cognizance of cycle that students may have to be guided to completely debrief. Teachers should not be overly critical of relapses in behaviour. Once the experience is completely integrated, the students will exit this cycle and get on with the next.

Debriefing is a daily exercise in most professions. It might be in psychology, healthcare, politics, or business. This is also accepted as an everyday necessity.

Classroom Action Research
Classroom Action Research is a method of finding out what works best in your own classroom so that you can improve student learning. We know a great deal about good teaching in general (e.g. McKeachie, 1999; Chickering and Gamson, 1987; Weimer, 1996), but every teaching situation is unique in terms of content, level, student skills, and learning styles, teacher skills and teaching styles, and many other factors. To maximize student learning, a teacher must find out what works best in a particular situation. Each teaching and research method, model and family is essential to the practice of technology studies. Teachers have their strengths and weaknesses, and adopt particular models to complement strengths and contradict weaknesses. Here, the teacher is well aware of the type of knowledge to be constructed. At other times, teachers equip their students with a research method to challenge them to construct new meanings and knowledge. In schools, the research methods are simplified, allowing the students to access the methods at their own levels.

Evolution of teaching methods

Ancient education
About 3000 BC, with the advent of writing, education became more conscious or self-reflecting, with specialized occupations such as scribe and astronomer requiring particular skills and knowledge. Philosophy in ancient Greece led to questions of educational method entering national discourse.

In his literary work The Republic, Plato described a system of instruction that he felt would lead to an ideal state. In his dialogues, Plato described the Socratic method, a form of inquiry and debate intended to stimulate critical thinking and illuminate ideas.

It has been the intent of many educators since, such as the Roman educator Quintilian, to find specific, interesting ways to encourage students to use their intelligence and to help them to learn.

Medieval education
Comenius, in Bohemia, wanted all children to learn. In his The World in Pictures, he created an illustrated textbook of things children would be familiar with in everyday life and used it to teach children. Rabelais described how the student Gargantua learned about the world, and what is in it.

Much later, Jean-Jacques Rousseau in his Emile, presented methodology to teach children the elements of science and other subjects. During Napoleonic warfare, the teaching methodology of Johann Heinrich Pestalozzi of Switzerland enabled refugee children, of a class believed to be unteachable, to learn. He described this in his account of an educational experiment at Stanz.

19th century
The Prussian education system was a system of mandatory education dating to the early 19th century. Parts of the Prussian education system have served as models for the education systems in a number of other countries, including Japan and the United States. The Prussian model required classroom management skills to be incorporated into the teaching process.

The University of Oxford and the University of Cambridge in England developed their distinctive method of teaching, the tutorial system, in the 19th century. This involves very small groups, from one to three students, meeting on a regular basis with tutors (originally college fellows, and now also doctoral students and post-docs) to discuss and debate pre-prepared work (either essays or problems). This is the central teaching method of these universities in both arts and science subjects, and has been compared to the Socratic method.

20th century
Newer teaching methods may incorporate television, radio, internet, multi media, and other modern devices. Some educators  believe that the use of technology, while facilitating learning to some degree, is not a substitute for educational methods that encourage critical thinking and a desire to learn. Inquiry learning is another modern teaching method. A popular teaching method that is being used by many teachers is hands on activities. Hands-on activities are activities that require movement, talking, and listening.

See also

Notes

References
 Achinstein P 2010. Evidence, Explanation, and Realism: Essays in Philosophy of Science. London: Oxford University Press. Asbaugh AF 1988. Plato's Theory of Explanation: A Study of the Cosmological Account in the Timaeus. USA: State University of New York Press. Behr AL 1988. Exploring the lecture method: An empirical study. Studies in Higher Education, 13(2): 189–200.
 Asbaugh AF 1988. Plato's Theory of Explanation: A Study of the Cosmological Account in the Timaeus. USA: State University of New York Press.
 Behr AL 1988. Exploring the lecture method: An empirical study. Studies in Higher Education, 13(2): 189–200.
 Brown GA, Daines JM 1981. Can explaining be learnt? Some lecturers' views. Higher Education, 10(5): 573–580.
 Brown G.A, Armstrong S 1984. Explaining and explanations. In: EC Wragg (Ed.): Classroom Teaching Skills. New York: Nichols Publishing Company, pp. 121–148
 Martin RJ 1970. Explaining, Understanding and Teaching. New York, McGraw- Hill
 Jarvie IC 1991. Explaining Explanation. David-Hillel Ruben New York.
 B. S. Manoj, Multi-Track Modular Teaching: An Advanced Teaching-Learning Method, Amazon, June 2019.

Further reading
Monroe, Paul. A Text-Book in the History of Education, Macmillan, 1915, OL1540509W.
Highet, Gilbert. The Art of Teaching, 1989, Vintage Books, .

Infographics
Teaching